The 2016 World Senior Curling Championships was from 16 to 23 April at the Karlstad Curling Arena in Karlstad, Sweden. The event will be held in conjunction with the 2016 World Mixed Doubles Curling Championship.

Men

Round-robin standings
Final Round Robin Standings

 decided not to attend the senior championships, so all of their matches were automatically forfeited.

Playoffs

Bronze-medal game
Saturday 23 April, 13:00

Gold-medal game
Saturday 23 April, 13:00

Women

Round-robin standings
Final Round Robin Standings

Playoffs

Bronze-medal game
Saturday 23 April, 13:00

Gold-medal game
Saturday 23 April, 13:00

References

External links

 
 

World Senior Curling Championships
World Senior Curling Championships
World Senior Curling Championships
International curling competitions hosted by Sweden
Sports competitions in Karlstad